These are the statistics for the UEFA Women's Euro 2013, which took place in Sweden.

Goalscorers
5 goals
 Lotta Schelin

3 goals
 Nilla Fischer

2 goals

 Mia Brogaard
 Mariann Gajhede Knudsen
 Marie-Laure Delie
 Eugénie Le Sommer
 Louisa Nécib
 Wendie Renard
 Célia Okoyino da Mbabi
 Melania Gabbiadini
 Solveig Gulbrandsen
 Verónica Boquete
 Jennifer Hermoso
 Josefine Öqvist

1 goal

 Johanna Rasmussen
 Eniola Aluko
 Laura Bassett
 Toni Duggan
 Annica Sjölund
 Simone Laudehr
 Lena Lotzen
 Dzsenifer Marozsán
 Anja Mittag
 Dagný Brynjarsdóttir
 Margrét Lára Viðarsdóttir
 Ilaria Mauro
 Marit Fiane Christensen
 Ada Hegerberg
 Kristine Wigdahl Hegland
 Ingvild Isaksen
 Nelli Korovkina
 Elena Morozova
 Elena Terekhova
 Alexia Putellas
 Kosovare Asllani
 Marie Hammarström

Own goal
 Raffaella Manieri (playing against Sweden)
 Irene Paredes (playing against Norway)

Assists
4 assists
 Kosovare Asllani

2 assists

 Eugénie Le Sommer
 Louisa Nécib
 Adriana Martín
 Lotta Schelin
 Sara Thunebro

1 assist

 Julie Rydahl Bukh
 Katrine Pedersen
 Anita Asante
 Jill Scott
 Annika Kukkonen
 Élodie Thomis
 Fatmire Bajramaj
 Leonie Maier
 Dzsenifer Marozsán
 Anja Mittag
 Célia Okoyino da Mbabi
 Hallbera Guðný Gísladóttir
 Raffaella Manieri
 Patrizia Panico
 Kristine Hegland
 Ingrid Hjelmseth
 Ingvild Stensland
 Nelli Korovkina
 Elena Terekhova
 Sonia Bermúdez
 Verónica Boquete
 Lisa Dahlkvist
 Marie Hammarström
 Sofia Jakobsson
 Therese Sjögran

Scoring
 Total number of matches played: 25
 Total number of goals scored: 56
 Average goals per match: 2.24
 Total number of braces: 4 – Lotta Schelin for Sweden against Finland and Iceland, Delie for France against Russia, Okoyino da Mbabi for Germany against Iceland
 Total number of hat-tricks: 0
 Total number of penalty kicks awarded: 6
 Total number of penalty kicks scored: 2 – Margrét Lára Viðarsdóttir for Iceland against Norway, Louisa Nécib for France against Denmark
 Total number of penalty kicks missed: 4 – Lotta Schelin for Sweden against Denmark, Kosovare Asllani for Sweden against Denmark, Trine Rønning for Norway against Germany, Solveig Gulbrandsen for Norway against Germany
 Most goals scored by a team: 13 – Sweden
 Most goals scored by an individual: 5 – Lotta Schelin
 Most assists given by an individual: 4 – Kosovare Asllani
 Fewest goals scored by a team: 0 – Netherlands
 Fastest goal in a match from kickoff: 3rd minute – Marie Hammarström for Sweden against Iceland, Marit Fiane Christensen for Norway against Denmark
 Latest goal in a match without extra time: 90+3rd minute – Alexia Putellas for Spain against England, Jennifer Hermoso for Spain against Norway

Stadiums
 Overall attendance: 216,888
 Average attendance per match: 8,676
 Highest attendance: 41,301 – Germany (1–0) Norway
 Lowest attendance: 2,157 – Russia (1–1) Spain

Discipline
 Total number of yellow cards: 48
 Average number of yellow cards per game: 1.92
 Total number of red cards: 0
 Average number of red cards per game: 0
 Most fouls committed: 10 – Sara Björk Gunnarsdóttir

Yellow cards
2 yellow cards

 Fara Williams
 Jennifer Cramer
 Hólmfríður Magnúsdóttir
 Alessia Tuttino
 Nilla Fischer

1 yellow card

 Janni Arnth Jensen
 Theresa Nielsen
 Cecilie Sandvej
 Christina Ørntoft
 Laura Bassett
 Emmi Alanen
 Annika Kukkonen
 Jaana Lyytikäinen
 Anna Westerlund
 Wendie Renard
 Nadine Keßler
 Annike Krahn
 Simone Laudehr
 Leonie Maier
 Fanndís Friðriksdóttir
 Katrín Jónsdóttir
 Elisa Bartoli
 Elisa Camporese
 Federica Di Criscio
 Raffaella Manieri
 Giorgia Motta
 Alice Parisi
 Martina Rosucci
 Cecilia Salvai
 Daniela Stracchi
 Dyanne Bito
 Daphne Koster
 Renée Slegers
 Marit Fiane Christensen
 Ingrid Hjelmseth
 Ingvild Stensland
 Gry Tofte Ims
 Nelli Korovkina
 Anastasia Kostyukova
 Elena Medved
 Tatiana Skotnikova
 Nagore Calderón
 Irene Paredes

Overall statistics

References

UEFA Women's Euro 2013